Chris Cauwenberghs (born February 4, 1947, in Hemiksem) is a Flemish actor presently living in the Netherlands.

He studied drama at the Royal Conservatory of Brussels and there received lessons from Nand Buyl en Leo Dewals. Since 1997, he has played the role of Kabouter Lui in the children's series Kabouter Plop.

In 2014, it became known that Cauwenberghs was determined to have cancer of the lymph nodes, causing him to be unable to perform as Kabouter Lui at Plopshows in the Autumn.

In July 2015, production house Studio 100 announced that Chris's health is improving. After heavy chemotherapy and radiation treatment, the actor has overcome cancer.

References

External links
 

1947 births
Living people